A Winsome Widow is a 1912 musical produced by Florenz Ziegfeld, Jr., which was a revised version of Charles Hale Hoyt's 1891 hit, A Trip to Chinatown, with a score by Raymond Hubbell.

History

The show debuted at the Moulin Rouge on April 11, 1912, and ran into September, with a total of 172 performances.  (A pre-opening performance was presented at Parson's Theatre in Hartford, Connecticut on April 8, 1912.)

One of its featured songs was "Be My Little Baby Bumble Bee" by Stanley Murphy and Henry I. Marshall.   The musical was a big hit, and featured a finale with real ice skating.

The large cast featured Emmy Wehlen, Leon Errol, the Dolly Sisters, Elizabeth Brice, Frank Tinney,  and Charles King.  A young Mae West played a small role, though she quit after five performances.

Though well received by audiences, the show had mixed reviews.  The New York Clipper called it "a spectacle of gayety and gorgeousness", but The New York Times was bored of its "sameness", and critic Sime Silverman of Variety said it was "at least forty minutes too long, draggy with superfluous people."

Primary cast (may be incomplete)

 Emmy Wehlen - Mrs. Guyer (the "winsome widow" of the title) 
 Leon Errol - Ben Gay
 Dolly Sisters - Jenny and Rosie
 Elizabeth Brice - Isabel
 Frank Tinney - Noah
 Kathleen Clifford
 Charles King - Wilder Daly
 Harry Conor - Welland Strong (the role he also played in  A Trip to Chinatown)
 Mae West - Le Petite Daffy

References

External links
 
 1912 recording of Be My Little Baby Bumble Bee at the U.S. Library of Congress

American plays
1912 plays
Broadway plays